Beksiński is a Polish surname. Notable people with the surname include:

 Tomasz Beksiński (1958–1999), Polish radio presenter, music journalist and movie translator
 Zdzisław Beksiński (1929–2005), Polish painter, photographer and sculptor, Tomasz's father

Polish-language surnames